{{Infobox cycling race report
| name               = Giro di Lombardia 2012
| series             = 2012 UCI World Tour
| race_no            = 27
| season_no          = 28
| image              =
| image_caption      =
| date               = 29 September 2012
| stages             = 1
| distance           = 251
| unit               = km
| time               = 6h 36' 26| speed              = 
| first              = Joaquim Rodríguez
| first_nat          = ESP
| first_team         = 
| second             = Samuel Sánchez
| second_nat         = ESP
| second_team        = 
| third              = Rigoberto Urán
| third_nat          = COL
| third_team         = 
| previous           = 2011
| next               = 2013
}}

The 2012 Giro di Lombardia or 2012 Il Lombardia was the 106th edition of the Giro di Lombardia single-day cycling race, often known as the Race of the Falling Leaves''. It was the penultimate event of the season in the 2012 UCI World Tour. The very steep climb Muro di Sormano returned to the route during the 2012 edition after an absence of fifty years and was situated before the Madonna del Ghisallo climb. Joaquim Rodríguez won the race after a solo breakaway initiated on the final climb of the day. He became the first Spaniard to win this Classic.

Teams
As the race was held under the auspices of the UCI World Tour, all eighteen ProTour teams were invited automatically.

Race summary
The weather conditions discouraged a lot of participants, since of the 197 riders who started the race, only 54 crossed the line as 143 competitors withdrew. He later rated his  crash as a "9.5 out of 10" and posted a picture of his bloodied jersey on Twitter.

Romain Bardet was the sole survivor of an early breakaway to crest atop the Muro di Sormano in front of the favorites, shaking off Alberto Losada near the top. Bardet was caught and 's Kevin De Weert broke free only to take a spill in a downhill turn. A couple more short-lived breaks ensued, including one by Portuguese Rui Costa. Joaquim Rodríguez attacked on the final difficulty of the day, the Villa Vergano climb. He arrived at the top of the difficulty alone and descended to Lecco as the rain was pouring down heavily. Nobody could reach him and he crossed the line in joy, throwing a water bottle in the air. Rodriguez stated after the victory: "I was fighting for a double goal today, to win this prestigious competition and to take the lead in the UCI World Tour Ranking, and I managed both. So I'm really happy."

Results

References

External links
 Official site

Giro Di Lombardia, 2012
Giro di Lombardia
Giro di Lombardia